Below is the list of Kategoria Superiore top goalscorers since it began in 1930. The all-time top goalscorer is Vioresin Sinani, who scored 207 goals before retiring at the start of 2012–13 season. Refik Resmja is the played who has scored more goals with a single team, 180 goals with Partizani. He also holds the record for most goals in a single season at 59, and he also holds the record for most awards won, with seven.

Top goalscorers

See also
Kategoria Superiore
List of Kategoria Superiore hat-tricks
List of Premier League players with 100 or more goals
List of FIFA World Cup hat-tricks

References

Kategoria Superiore
Football in Albania